Charles Little may refer to:

 Charles Little (Royal Navy officer) (1882–1973)
 Charles Little (cricketer) (1870-1922), English cricketer
 Charles A. Little (1854–1920), American lawyer and politician
 Charles Coffin Little (1799–1869), American publisher
 Charles Herbert Little (1907–2004), Canadian Director of Naval Intelligence
 Charles Newton Little (1858–1923), American mathematician and civil engineer